Maria is a feminine given name. It is given in many languages influenced by Latin Christianity.

It has its origin as the feminine form of the Roman name Marius (see Maria gens), and, after Christianity has spread across the Roman empire, it became the Latinised form of the name of Miriam: Mary, mother of Jesus.

Maria (Greek: Μαρία) is a form of the name used in the New Testament, standing alongside Mariam (Μαριάμ). It reflects the Syro-Aramaic name Maryam, which is in turn derived from the Biblical Hebrew name Miriam. As a result of their similarity and syncretism, the Latin original name Maria and the Hebrew-derived Maria combined to form a single name.

The name is also sometimes used as a male (middle) name. This was historically the case in many Central Europe countries and still is the case in countries with strong Catholic traditions, where it signified patronage of the Virgin Mary (French-speakers often did the same with Marie).

Variants and usage

Maria was a frequently given name in southern Europe even in the medieval period. In addition to the simple name, there arose a tradition of naming girls after specific titles of Mary, feast days associated with Mary and specific Marian apparitions (such as María de los Dolores, María del Pilar, María del Carmen etc., whence the derived given names of Dolores, Pilar, Carmen etc.). By contrast, in northern Europe the name only rose to popularity after the Reformation.

Because the name is so frequent in Christian tradition, a tradition of giving compound names has developed, with a number of such compounds themselves becoming very popular. Examples, among numerous others, include:
Anna + Maria (Anne-Marie, Marianne)
Maria + Luisa (Marie-Louise)
Margarita + Maria (English Margaret Mary, French Marguerite Marie)
Maria + Antonia (Maria Antonia, French Marie-Antoinette)
Maria + Helena (Italian Maria Elena, Spanish María Elena)
Maria + Teresa (Maria Theresa, French Marie Thérèse)

As a feminine given name, Maria ranked 109th in the United States as of 2015, down from rank 31 held during 1973–1975.

Spelling variants of Maria include: Mária (Hungarian, Slovakian), María (Greek, Icelandic, Spanish), Máire and Muire (Irish), Marya and Marija (transliterated from Cyrillic), Maria (Polish). Due to a very strong devotion of Irish and Polish Catholics to the Blessed Virgin Mary, a special exception is made for two other forms of her name – Muire and Maryja: no one else may take that name, similar to the way the name Jesus is not used in most languages. The English form Mary is derived via French Marie.

A great number of hypocoristic forms are in use in numerous languages. Cyrillic Maryam and Miriam have numerous variants, such as
Mariami (Georgian)
Mariamma, biblical Mariamme, Mariamne
Məryəm (Azerbaijani)
Meryem (Kurdish, Turkish)
Myriam (French)

The spelling in Semitic abjads is mrym: Aramaic ܡܪܝܡ, Hebrew מרים, Arabic مريم.

Cyrillic has Марыя (Marýja) (Belarusian), Марија (Marija) (Serbian, Macedonian), and Мария (Maríja) (Russian, Bulgarian).

Georgian uses მარიამ (Mariam) and მარია (Maria); Armenian has Մարիամ (Mariam).

Chinese has adopted the spelling 瑪麗 (simplified 玛丽, pinyin Mǎlì).

The variant Mariah (usually pronounced ) was rarely given in the United States prior to the 1990s, when it bounced in popularity, from rank 562 in 1989 to rank 62 in 1998, in imitation of the name of singer Mariah Carey (whose Vision of Love topped the charts in 1990).

Masculine name 
Maria is used as a part of masculine given names in Hispanic and Roman Catholic tradition.

People

Female 
 Maaria Eira, Finnish opera singer and actress
 Maria of Russia (several people)
 Maria al-Qibtiyya
 Maria I of Portugal (1734-1816), Queen of Portugal
 María Conchita Alonso (born 1957), American singer/songwriter and actress
 Maria Ahtisa Manalo, Miss International Philippines 2018
 Maria Ângela Carrascalão, East Timorese politician
 Maria II of Portugal (1818-1853), Queen of Portugal
 María Fernanda Aristizábal (born 1997), Colombian model and beauty pageant titleholder
 María Azambuya (1944–2011), Uruguayan actress and theatre director
 Maria Bamford (born 1970), American stand-up comedian, actress, and voice actress
 María Bazo (born 1998), Peruvian windsurfer
 Maria Beasley, American inventor
 Maria Beig (1920–2018), German author
 Maria Bello (born 1967), American actress and writer
 María Belón (born 1966), Spanish physician and motivational speaker
 Maria Brink (born 1977), American singer and songwriter
 María Bolívar (born 1975), Venezuelan politician
 Maria Callas (1923–1977), Greek-American soprano
 Maria Callani (1778–1803), Italian 18th century portrait painter active in Parma
 Maria Cantwell (born 1958), U.S. Senatoor
 Maria Cole (1922–2012), American jazz singer
 Maria Colwell (1965–1973), British female murder victim
 Maria Christina (several people)
 Maria Dallas, New Zealand singer
 Maria Damanaki (born 1952) Greek politician
 Maria d'Apparecida (1926–2017), Brazilian opera singer
 Maria Darling, British voice actress
 Maria de Lourdes Martins Cruz, East Timorese religious sister
 Maria de Vasconcelos (born 1970), Portuguese psychiatrist, singer and songwriter
 Maria do Céu Sarmento, East Timorese politician
 Maria Domingas Alves, East Timorese politician
 Maria Durhuus (born 1977), Danish politician
 Maria Edgeworth (1768–1849), Anglo-Irish writer of adults' and children's literature
 María Escudero-Escribano (born 1983), Spanish chemist
María-Esther Vidal, Venezuelan scientist
 Maria Louise Eve (1842–1900), American poet
 Maria Ewing (1950–2022), American opera singer
 Maria Farantouri (born 1947), Greek singer
 María Fernanda Di Giacobbe (born 1964), Venezuelan chocolatier
 Maria Fyfe (1938–2020), Scottish politician
 María Esther García López (born, 1948), poet, writer; president, Asturias Writers Association
 María la Grande, prominent Tehuelche leader of the early 19th century
 Maria Guyomar de Pinha (1664–1728), Siamese cook
 Maria Harfanti (born 1992), Miss World Indonesia 2015
 Maria Höfl-Riesch (born 1984), German alpine skier
 María Holly (born 1932), widow of rock and roll pioneer Buddy Holly
 Maria Iliou (born 1960) Greek film director, scriptwriter and producer
 Maria James (1793–1868), Welsh-born American poet
 Maria Jane Jewsbury (1800–1833), English writer, poet, literary reviewer
 María José (several people)
 Maria Kanellis (born 1982), American professional wrestler
 Maria Kekkonen, Finnish erotic actress
 Maria Brace Kimball (1852–1933), American educator, elocutionist, writer
 Maria Kochetkova (born 1984), Russian ballet dancer
 Maria Kovrigina (1910–1995), Russian physician and Soviet minister of health 
 Maria Kowroski (born 1976), American ballet dancer
 Maria Lampadaridou Pothou (born 1933), Greek novelist, poet and playwright
 Maria Elise Turner Lauder (1833–1922), Canadian writer
 Maria Lauterbach (1987–2007), American murder victim
 Maria Lioudaki (1894–1947), Greek educator, folklorist, and resistance fighter
 Maria White Lowell (1821–1853), American poet, abolitionist
 Maria Lugones (1944–2020), American philosopher
 Maria Lynn Ehren (born 1992), Thai singer and model
 Maria Laura Mainetti (1939–2000), Italian Catholic sister and murder victim
 María Emma Mannarelli (born 1954), Peruvian feminist writer, historian, professor
 Maria Mandl (1912–1948), Austrian Nazi SS commandant of the female camp at Auschwitz concentration camp executed for war crimes
 Maria Rika Maniates (1937–2011), Canadian musicologist
 María Marcano de León, Puerto Rican government official
 Maria Mazina (born 1964), Russian Olympic champion épée fencer
 Maria Alberta Menéres (1930–2019), Portuguese writer
 Maria Montessori (1870–1952), Italian educator
 , Japanese voice actress
 Maria Nikiforova (1885–1919), Ukrainian anarchist partisan
 , Japanese actress
 Princess Maria Pia of Bourbon-Parma (born 1934)
 Maria Palmer (1917–1981), Austrian-born American actress
 Maria Petri (1939–2022), English association football supporter
 Maria Posobchuk (1890–1992), Ukrainian weaver
 Maria Rahajeng (born 1991), Miss World Indonesia 2014
 Maria Goretti, a victim of crime and saint
 Maria Rasputin (1898–1977), memoirist
 María Teresa Rejas (born 1946), Spanish politician
 Maria Ressa (born 1963), Filipina-American author, journalist and Nobel Peace Prize laureate
 Maria Reynolds (1768–1828), wife of James Reynolds
 Maria Sakkari (born 1995), Greek professional tennis player
 María Elena Salinas, American broadcast journalist, news anchor, and author
 Maria Selena (born 1990), Indonesian beauty pageant titleholder who won Puteri Indonesia 2011
 Maria Sharapova (born 1987), Russian professional tennis player
 Maria Shriver (born 1955), American journalist and activist
 Maria Antónia Siza (1940–1973), Portuguese artist
 Maria Strömkvist (born 1964), Swedish politician
 Maria Tenazi (1903–1930), Soviet Armenian silent film actress
 Maria Theresa (several people)
 Maria von Trapp (1905–1987), Austrian-born American singer
 María Valverde (born 1987), Spanish actress
 Maria Eulália Vares, Brazilian mathematical statistician and probability theorist
 Maria Vasilkova (born 1978), Russian politician
 Maria Chantal Videla (born 2002), Filipino-Argentine actress, model and singer of K-pop girl group Lapillus
 Maria Walliser (born 1963), Swiss alpine skier
 Maria Torrence Wishart (1893 – 1982), Canadian medical illustrator and the founder of the University of Toronto's Art as Applied to Medicine program
 Maria Zandbang (1886–1972), Polish equestrian

Fictional characters 
 Maria, a fictional character played by Laura Nicole in the British web series Corner Shop Show
 Maria, a villain character in the tokusatsu Chōjin Sentai Jetman
 Maria, the youngest princess of Macedon in the Fire Emblem video game series.
 Grace Maria Fleed, a character from the anime Grendizer.
 Maria (West Side Story), the main female protagonist from the musical West Side Story
 María Clara, a character from the novel Noli Me Tángere (novel) by Filipino writer and activist José Rizal
 Maria Jackson, a character from The Sarah Jane Adventures
 Maria Renard, a character in the Castlevania video game series
 Maria Robotnik, a character in the Sonic the Hedgehog video game series
 Maria von Trapp, the main female protagonist from the musical The Sound of Music
 Lady Maria of the Astral Clocktower, a boss character from The Old Hunters DLC for the video game Bloodborne
 Maria Calavera, a supporting character in the animated web series RWBY
 Maria Fritz, the daughter of Ymir Fritz, namesake of Wall Maria and a minor character in the anime and manga Attack on Titan
 Maria Wong, a character from the Canadian animated television series Braceface

Male (as part of a compound name or as a middle name) 
 Carlo Maria Abate, Italian racecar driver
 Alberto María de Agostini, Italian explorer
 Carlos María de Alvear, Argentine general
 José María Aznar, Spanish politician, former Spanish prime minister
 Angelo Maria Bandini, Italian author and librarian
 Antonio María Barbieri, Uruguayan cardinal
 Ferdinand Maria, Elector of Bavaria
 Giovanni Maria Benzoni, Italian sculptor
 Matteo Maria Boiardo, Italian poet
 Giovanni Maria Bottala, Italian painter
 Klaus Maria Brandauer, Austrian actor
 Giuseppe Maria Buonaparte, Corsican politician
 Carlo Maria Cipolla, Italian economic historian
 Giovanni Carlo Maria Clari, Italian composer
 Carlo Maria Curci, Italian theologian
 Corrado Maria Daclon, Italian journalist
 Felix Maria Diogg, Swiss painter
 Timm Maria Franz Elstner, German TV host
 Giovanni Maria Mastai-Ferretti, better known as Pope Pius IX
 Johann Maria Farina, Italian-German perfumer
 Carlo Innocenzio Maria Frugoni, Italian poet
 Alessandro Maria Gaetano Galilei, Italian architect and mathematician
 Giuseppe Maria Giulietti, Italian soldier
 Carlo Maria Giulini, Italian conductor
 Francesco Maria Grimaldi, Italian mathematician
 Christoph Maria Herbst, German actor
 Franco Maria Malfatti, Italian politician
 Thomas Maria Mamachi, Italo-Greek Dominican theologian and historian
 Antonio Maria Maraggiano, Italian sculptor
 Carlo Maria Martini, Italian cardinal
 Giovanni Maria Nanino, Italian composer
 Tommaso Maria Napoli, Italian architect
 José María Olazábal, Spanish golfer
 Francesco Maria Piave, Italian librettist
 Carlo Maria Pintacuda, Italian racecar driver
 Francesco Maria Pritilli, Italian scholar and antiquarian
 Erich Maria Remarque, German author
 Franco Maria Ricci, Italian art publisher
 Rainer Maria Rilke, German poet
 Jan Maria Rokita, Polish politician
 Anton Maria Schyrleus of Rheita, Czech astronomer
 Juan Carlos Alfonso Víctor María de Borbón y Borbón-Dos Sicilias, king of Spain
 Charles Edward Louis John Casimir Silvester Maria Stuart, leader of the Jacobite rebellion
 José María Canlás Sison, Filipino activist and founder of the Communist Party of the Philippines
 Victor Maria Regis Sotto (born 1989), Filipino politician
 Giuseppe Maria Tomasi, Italian cardinal and saint
 Giovanni Maria Trabaci, Italian composer
 Antonio Maria Vassallo, Italian painter
 Francesco Maria Veracini, Italian composer and violinist
 Gianni Versace born Giovanni Maria Versace, Italian fashion designer
 Filippo Maria Visconti, Duke of Milan
 Gian Maria Visconti, Duke of Milan
 Gian Maria Volonté, Italian actor
 Carl Maria von Weber, German composer
 Edward Maria Wingfield, English explorer
 Tommaso Maria Zigliara, Italian cardinal
 Maximilian Maria Kolbe, Polish Conventual Franciscan
 Karl-Theodor Maria Nikolaus Johann Jacob Philipp Franz Joseph Sylvester Freiherr von und zu Guttenberg
 Juan María Bordaberry, Uruguayan dictator
 Franz Joseph Hermann Michael Maria von Papen, Erbsälzer zu Werl und Neuwerk, German politician, diplomat, Prussian nobleman and General Staff officer

See also 
 Maria (disambiguation)

References 

Italian feminine given names
Romanian feminine given names
Russian feminine given names
Slovak feminine given names
Spanish feminine given names
Portuguese feminine given names
Swiss feminine given names
Pakistani feminine given names
Slavic feminine given names
Scandinavian feminine given names
Ukrainian feminine given names
German feminine given names
Dutch feminine given names
Georgian feminine given names
Greek feminine given names
Armenian feminine given names
Bulgarian feminine given names
Danish feminine given names
Norwegian feminine given names
Icelandic feminine given names
Swedish feminine given names
Finnish feminine given names
Filipino feminine given names
Belarusian feminine given names
Circassian feminine given names
Polish feminine given names
Serbian feminine given names
Slovene feminine given names
Croatian feminine given names
English feminine given names